Azhar Khan (born January 7, 1984) is an Indian-American actor and comedian, known for his role as Mobley for three seasons of Mr. Robot. Vox culture writer Caroline Framke called his work on Mr. Robot "wonderful and understated." Khan, who lives in New York City, has done theater and comedy performances as well as his television work. He began acting in middle school.

References

External links
 

1984 births
Living people
American television actors